Prabowo Subianto Djojohadikusumo (born 17 October 1951) is an Indonesian politician, businessman and former army lieutenant general who is the currently-appointed Minister of Defense of the Republic of Indonesia. He is the son of Sumitro Djojohadikusumo, an Indonesian economist, and Dora Sigar. He is the former husband of Titiek Suharto, the late President Suharto's second daughter. They were married in 1983 and divorced in 1998 during the Indonesian political crisis.

Prabowo graduated from the Indonesian Military Academy in 1970 and served in the Special Forces (Kopassus) until his appointment as chief of the Strategic Reserve Command (Kostrad) in 1998. That same year, he was dishonorably discharged from the military and subsequently banned from entering the United States because of alleged human rights violations. He has been described as nationalist-right.

In early 2008, Prabowo's inner circle, including Fadli Zon, established the Great Indonesia Movement Party (Gerindra). In the 2009 presidential election, he ran unsuccessfully for the vice-presidency as Megawati Sukarnoputri's running mate. He contested the 2014 presidential election and was defeated by Jakarta Governor Joko Widodo, which he initially disputed. He made another unsuccessful run for the presidency in 2019 with Sandiaga Uno as his running mate and with the support of Gerindra, the Prosperous Justice Party (PKS), the National Mandate Party (PAN), the Democratic Party and Berkarya Party. His refusal to accept the result saw his followers stage protests that sparked deadly riots in Jakarta.

On 10 October 2021, Gerindra announced Prabowo as their candidate in the 2024 Indonesian presidential election. In June 2022, Prabowo initially declined the party's nomination, stating that he wanted to give the opportunity to another politician to run for the presidency. Despite his declining the bid, Gerindra insisted on his nomination. On 12 August 2022, Prabowo announced that he accepted Gerindra's nomination to contest the 2024 presidential election.

Family background

Prabowo's father, Sumitro Djojohadikusumo, was an economist who served as former President Suharto's minister for the economy and minister for research and technology. Sumitro named Prabowo after his own younger brother, a martyr hero who died in a battle against the Japanese in Lengkong, Tangerang during the Indonesian National Revolution. Prabowo's mother, Dora Maria Sigar, was a Protestant Christian of Minahasan descent, who originated from the Sigar-Maengkom family in Langowan, North Sulawesi.

Prabowo has two older sisters, Bintianingsih and Mayrani Ekowati, and one younger brother, Hashim Djojohadikusumo. Hashim's pribumi conglomerate business interests stretch from Indonesia to Canada and Russia. Between 1966 and 1968, the family lived in London, where Prabowo attended and graduated from The American School in London. Sumitro subsequently encouraged his son to attend a military academy. One of Prabowo's role models was Turkish military figure Atatürk, and according to peers and observers, Prabowo was talented with a passion for stratagems and had an appetite for political power.

Prabowo's grandfather, Margono Djojohadikusumo, was the founder of Bank Negara Indonesia, the first leader of Indonesia's Provisional Supreme Advisory Council (Dewan Pertimbangan Agung Sementara), and a member of the Investigating Committee for Preparatory Work for Independence (Badan Penyelidik Usaha Persiapan Kemerdekaan ).

Prabowo married Suharto's daughter, Siti Hediati Hariyadi, in 1983. They have a son, Didit Hediprasetyo, who lived in Boston before settling in Paris to pursue a career in design. Prabowo is uncle to Rahayu Saraswati Djojohadikusumo.

Military career 
Prabowo enrolled in Indonesia's Military Academy in Magelang in 1970. He graduated in 1974 with others who would gain senior leadership positions such as Susilo Bambang Yudhoyono.

In 1976, Prabowo served in the Indonesian National Army Special Force Kopassus and was assigned as the commander of Group 1 Komando Pasukan Sandhi Yudha (Kopassandha), which was one of the Indonesian Army's Nanggala commando units in East Timor, the former Portuguese territory that Indonesia had invaded the previous year. Prabowo, then 26 years old, was the youngest Nanggala commander. Prabowo led the mission to capture the vice president of Fretilin, who was the first Prime Minister of East Timor, Nicolau dos Reis Lobato. Guiding Prabowo was Antonio Lobato – Nicolau's younger brother. On 31 December 1978, Prabowo's company found and fatally shot Nicolau in the stomach as he was being escorted in Maubisse, fifty kilometres south of Dili.

In 1985 Prabowo attended the Advanced Infantry Officers Course at Fort Benning, in the United States for commando training. In the early 1990s, as the commander of Kopassus Group 3, the now Major General Prabowo attempted to crush the East Timorese independence movement by using irregular troops (hooded "ninja" gangs dressed in black and operating at night) and, in main towns and villages, militias trained and directed by Kopassus commanders. Human rights abuses rose. The Army's 1997 campaign was called Operation Eradicate.

In 1996, Prabowo led the Mapenduma Operation in the mountainous terrain of Papua, Indonesia. The goal of the operation was the release of 11 scientific researchers, who had been taken hostage by the Free Papua Movement (OPM). The researchers were five Indonesians, four Britons, one Dutchman and his pregnant German wife. Two of the Indonesian male hostages were killed shortly before the rescue operation. The mission involved covert support from British Military Attache and SAS veteran Colonel Ivor Helberg. Following the hostage transfer, Kopassus under Prabowo began a reprisal campaign against villages perceived to support OPM, in one incident at Geselema village attacking the villagers with a military helicopter disguised as a Red Cross helicopter.

On 20 March 1998, Prabowo was appointed head of the 27,000-strong Army Strategic Reserve Command (Kostrad), that Suharto had commanded in 1965.

Role in 1998 riots and the Fall of Suharto
Less than three months after his appointment as head of Kostrad, on the first day of the May 1998 riots, Prabowo urged the commander of the Indonesian National Armed Forces, Wiranto, to let him bring his Strategic Reserve units from outside Jakarta into the city to help restore order. Hundreds of men trained by Kopassus (Prabowo's former command) were flown from Dili to Yogyakarta in chartered planes, and then on to Jakarta by train. Prabowo publicly urged Indonesians to join him to fight "traitors to the nation". On the morning of 14 May, Kopassus troops escorted young thugs from Lampung in southern Sumatra into the capital. Thus Prabowo was accused of using his contacts in his former command to import and create trouble, while Wiranto had declined to give Prabowo's current command, Kostrad, permission to quell the existing trouble, in line with classic Javanese tactic to stir chaos to discredit a rival and/or seize power.

Troops under Prabowo's command kidnapped and tortured at least nine democracy activists in the months before the May 1998 Riots. In one testimony, a former detainee told of being tortured for days in an unidentified location, allegedly a military camp where most of their time was spent blindfolded, while being forced to answer repeated questions, mainly concerning their political activities. The abuse included being punched, terrorised physically and mentally, and given electric shocks. Later, in 2009, two of the nine men were candidates for Gerindra, Prabowo's political party, and another served as his media adviser. Prabowo was also suspected of organising the kidnappings of another 13 activists (all of whom remain "missing") between February 1997 and May 1998.

Later investigations into the May riots revealed that violence in Jakarta was the result of an internal struggle within the military elite to become Suharto's successor. Many believed Prabowo, as Strategic Reserve commander, sought to become his father-in-law's successor and coveted the commander of the Armed Forces position held by General Wiranto, who was favoured to succeed Suharto. Together with Operations Commander for Greater Jakarta (Pangkoops Jaya) Major General Sjafrie Sjamsoeddin, Prabowo aimed to terrorise opponents of the government and to show that Wiranto was "an incompetent commander who could not control disorder". During August and September, the fact-finding team interviewed Prabowo, Sjafrie, and other military commanders regarding their movements during the Jakarta riots. Prabowo asserted that he was unsure of the precise movements of military forces in the capital and deferred to Sjafrie. In its final report, the fact-finding team suspected that, on the night of 14 May, Prabowo met with several Armed Forces and prominent civilian figures at the Kostrad headquarters to discuss organization of the violence. However, this was later refuted by several people who attended the meeting, including prominent human rights lawyer Adnan Buyung Nasution and Joint Fact-Finding Team member Bambang Widjojanto. Further testimonies by Prabowo in the years following the investigation contradicted the team's report and led to scepticism of the team's allegations.

On 21 May 1998, Suharto announced his resignation from the presidency and Vice President B. J. Habibie took over as president.

On the afternoon following Habibie's inauguration as president, Prabowo demanded of Habibie that he be put in charge of the Army in place of Wiranto. However, Habibie and Wiranto demoted Prabowo from Kostrad commander instead, and the following day, announced Wiranto's promotion to Minister of Defense and Security and the Indonesian National Armed Forces (ABRI, later renamed TNI) commander. A furious Prabowo went to the Presidential Palace packing a sidearm and with trucks of his Kostrad troops. On being blocked from entering the Habibie's office, he instead went to Suharto who rebuked him. Prabowo was visited by Wiranto at his home over the weekend of 23–24 May and subsequently reassigned to a non-combat role at the Armed Forces Command and General Staff College in Bandung.

Following an ABRI investigation, Prabowo acknowledged responsibility for the kidnapping of the activists. He was discharged from military service in August. He and Wiranto denied that the discharge was a result of disciplinary action. In August 1998, the Dewan Kehormatan Perwira (Officers Council of Honor) tried and found Prabowo guilty of "misinterpreting orders" in the kidnapping of anti-Suharto activists in 1998. He was discharged from military services and went into a voluntary exile in Jordan where he knew that country's new young King Abdullah as a fellow commander of special forces. In an interview with Asiaweek magazine in 2000, Prabowo said "I never threatened Habibie. I was not behind the riots. That is a great lie. I never betrayed Pak Harto. I never betrayed Habibie. I never betrayed my country...There was a certain group that wanted to make me a scapegoat, maybe to hide their involvement."" Rights groups have long questioned Prabowo's eligibility to run for president, noting that he was discharged dishonorably from the Army in August 1998 for "misinterpreting orders" in the abduction of the democracy activists. While that was the military's official statement, observers have long believed that it was a coup conspiracy that saw Prabowo, then the commander of the Army Strategic Reserves, given his marching orders.

As a 2014 presidential candidate, Prabowo's past came under renewed scrutiny, with many organizations calling for him to step down. A coalition, which consisted of Imparsial, Kontras, the Setara Institute, and the Human Rights Working Group (HRWG), combined under the Civil Society Coalition Against Forgetting, visited the National Commission on Human Rights (Komnas HAM) in Jakarta on 7 May 2014 to urge the commission to re-investigate Prabowo. A 27 June 2014 report indicated that an investigative journalist, Allan Nairn, had been threatened with arrest "for revealing the former general's role in human rights abuses."

Business career 
After being discharged from the military, Prabowo joined his brother Hashim Djojohadikusumo's business. He purchased Kiani Kertas, a paper pulp and plantation company based in Mangkajang, East Kalimantan. Prior to Prabowo's purchase, Kiani was owned by Bob Hasan, a businessman close to former President Suharto. Today, Prabowo's Nusantara Group controls 27 companies in Indonesia and abroad. Prabowo's companies include Nusantara Energy (oil and natural gas, coal), Tidar Kerinci Agung (palm oil plantations) and Jaladri Nusantara (fishery industry).

Prabowo rebranded Kiani Kertas to Kertas Nusantara. The company was established in 1990 and is part of the Nusantara Energy. It controls an area of 3,400 hectares used for paper mills, employee housing, private schools, and various company facilities. Kiani has been awarded ISO 900–2005 status as one of the highest quality management companies. It is reported that Kiani Kertas has been experiencing financial difficulties, and in early 2014, workers took to the streets to demand their wages which had not been paid in five months.

Prabowo was the wealthiest presidential candidate in the 2009 election, with assets of Rp 1.5 trillion (about US$150 million) and US$7.5 million.

In 2007, PT Ridlatama, whose majority stakeholder was British-based Churchill PLC, conducted a geo-survey eastern Kalimantan for coal. Two months after the survey yielded positive results, East Kutai officials granted mining licenses to Nusantara Energy (a subsidiary of the Nusantara Group, a conglomerate owned by Prabowo's family) to operate in the area surveyed by Ridlatama. In 2010, Ridlatama's license was revoked, effectively completing Nusantara's take over of Churchill's operations. Churchill appealed to the Supreme Court of Indonesia but lost the case. In 2012,  Churchill filed a case against the government of Indonesia at the International Centre for Settlement of Investment Disputes, demanding $2 billion in compensation. Indonesia argued that ICSID had no authority to arbitrate. In 2014 ICSID ruled that it had the authority and the case is still ongoing.

In 2014, the regent of East Kutai, Isran Noor, publicly endorsed Prabowo as a presidential candidate. He also considered pressing criminal charges against Churchill, alleging that Churchill forged its license.

NGOs

 The Indonesian Farmers' Association was established in 1973 to advocate for the farmers' rights. Prabowo was elected President of HKTI in 2004, and he was reappointed in 2010 for a second term.
 The Indonesian Traditional Market Traders Association (APPSI) is a non-profit organization advocating for the welfare of traders in Indonesia's traditional markets. Prabowo was elected as president of APPSI in 2008.
 Pencak silat is one of Indonesia's traditional martial arts. The Indonesian Pencak Silat Association (IPSI) oversees the regulation of the sport in Indonesia, develops athletes, and organises tournaments. Prabowo was elected as president of IPSI in 2004 and was re-elected in 2012 for a third consecutive term.

Politics
Using his connections to President Suharto, Prabowo and his brother worked to silence journalistic and political critics in the 1990s. Hashim unsuccessfully pressured Goenawan Mohamad to sell his outspoken and banned Tempo magazine to him. As a lieutenant colonel, Prabowo invited Gus Dur to his battalion headquarters in 1992 and warned him to stick to religion and to stay out of politics, or face unspecified actions if he continued to oppose the president. He later warned the intellectual Nurcholish Madjid (Cak Nur) to resign from the KIPP, the election monitoring unit set up by Goenawan Mohamad, which armed forces commander Feisal Tanjung had denounced as "obviously unconstitutional".

In 2004, Prabowo was one of five contenders vying to become Golkar party's presidential candidate. He received the lowest number of votes, just 39, and was eliminated in the first round. The second round of voting was won by Wiranto.

Establishment of the Great Indonesia Movement Party 
In early 2008, Prabowo's inner circle, including Fadli Zon, established the Great Indonesia Movement Party (Gerindra), which nominated Prabowo for the presidency in the 2009 elections. However, having won 26 out of 560 seats in the Indonesian parliament, the party did not have the required numbers, and Prabowo ran as a vice presidential candidate to Megawati Soekarnoputri, daughter of Indonesia's first president Sukarno. The pair, referred to colloquially by the Indonesian media as Mega–Pro, earned 27% of the vote and lost to Susilo Bambang Yudhoyono and his running mate, economist Boediono.

2014 presidential election 

In November 2011, Prabowo announced his intention to run in the 2014 presidential elections. Surveys published by the Center for Policy Studies and Strategic Development (Puskaptis) and by the Indonesian Survey Institute published on 23 February 2012 gave him the lead – but observers and activists cast doubt on the polls.

In March 2012, Gerindra named Prabowo its 2014 presidential candidate. The party's slogan was then changed to Gerindra Menang Prabowo Presiden (Gerindra Wins, Prabowo Becomes President). Prabowo said he would run an investment-friendly administration if he won and that Indonesia needed more energy exploration. Furthermore, he said he had been in close contact with labour unions and believed rising worker discontent could be managed with a wise national budget. He promised to use military-style efficiency to push through chronically delayed infrastructure projects, as well as to create jobs in the archipelago's backwaters by improving agricultural productivity. Another pillar to Prabowo's platform was that he was solidly secular, and his party planned to protect the rights of minority religious groups in the Muslim-majority country.

According to numerous quick counts after the 9 April legislative election, Gerinda came in third place, positioning Prabowo as one of two leading presidential candidates for the election to be held 9 July, the other being Jakarta governor, Joko Widodo. On Tuesday, 20 May 2014, Golkar, along with the United Development Party (PPP), the National Mandate Party (PAN), the Prosperous Justice Party (PKS), and the Crescent Star Party (PBB), officially endorsed Prabowo to run for the 2014 presidential election; the coalition collected 48.9% of votes and 52.1 seats in the parliament. The day before, Prabowo had picked former Coordinating Minister for Economics Hatta Rajasa as his vice-presidential running mate.

On 22 July 2014, the day that the KPU was due to announce its official tally, Prabowo withdrew from the race after having insisted on his victory since the initial quick counts were released, although the majority showed Jokowi ahead. He attributed this withdrawal to Indonesia "fail[ing] in its duty to democracy" because of "massive cheating that is structured and systematic", and stated that he and Hatta "exercise our constitutional right to reject the presidential election and declare it unconstitutional". His speech, aired live, implied he would challenge the results in the Constitutional Court. Later reports indicated confusion over whether Prabowo had resigned from the election or simply rejected the count.

According to Douglas Ramage of the Jakarta-based Bower's Asia Group, this was the first time since reformasi began in 1998 that the legitimacy of an election was questioned; he declared the country was entering "uncharted territory". The legality of a Prabowo challenge is questionable, as – if he withdrew – he is no longer considered a presidential candidate. If he can make the challenge, according to The Jakarta Post, the gap between the two is sufficient to make such a challenge difficult. Under the presidential election law, Prabowo could face up to six years in prison and a 100 billion rupiah ($10 million) fine for withdrawing. Later that evening, Joko Widodo was officially announced as president and began to receive congratulations from world leaders.

Following the announcement, the value of the Indonesian rupiah dropped by 0.3%, and the JSX Composite fell by 0.9%. Observers denied Prabowo's allegations of cheating, finding that the elections were "generally fair and free"; Maswadi Rauf of the University of Indonesia stated that there was "no sign of significant fraud", and that Prabowo's withdrawal simply reflected "the real attitudes of the elite, who are not yet ready to accept losing". On 21 August 2014, the Indonesian Constitutional Court rejected his claim of fraud, confirming his election loss.

2019 presidential election 

On 12 April 2018, Prabowo announced he would contest Indonesia's 2019 presidential election if he could obtain sufficient support from other political parties. Indonesian media had speculated on whether Prabowo would become a presidential candidate or a "king-maker" giving his support to another candidate. Prabowo's brother Hashim in March 2018 said health and logistical factors had to be considered before the party announces a presidential candidate.

In April 2018, John McBeth reported Maritime Coordinating Minister Luhut Panjaitan had held a series of meetings with Prabowo, culminating in the proposal of a joint Widodo-Prabowo ticket for the 2019 election. Luhut reportedly lost his enthusiasm after Prabowo allegedly said he would want to be in charge of the military and seven seats in any new cabinet. Fadli Zon denied Luhut and Prabowo had discussed politics, claiming they merely spoke about Europe's move to limit imports of Indonesian palm oil. Gerindra official Andre Rosiade also dismissed the report as a hoax.

On 10 August 2018, Prabowo registered at the KPU office for the 2019 presidential election with Sandiaga Uno as his running mate and with the support of Gerindra, PKS, PAN, the Democratic Party and Berkarya Party. The Democratic Party had wanted Prabowo to choose Agus Harimurti Yudhoyono as his running mate. Following the election, 'quick counts' conducted at polling stations by independent institutions authorised by the government indicated Widodo had won by a margin of about 10%, but Prabowo claimed victory, insisting a real count by his side showed he received 62% of the vote. His unsubstantiated claims of widespread cheating prompted his supporters to stage protests in Jakarta, resulting in riots that left eight people dead and 737 injured. The Constitutional Court in June 2019 unanimously rejected Prabowo's appeal against the election result.

On 23 October 2019, Prabowo was inaugurated as Indonesia's Minister of Defense by president Joko Widodo.

Minister of Defense

Shortly after his inauguration, Prabowo began advocating for a "total people's war" doctrine for Indonesia's national defense.

Following an incident in late 2019 where Chinese vessels violated Indonesian EEZ off the Natuna Islands, Prabowo called for a cautious response, referring to China as a "friendly nation", for which he was criticised by netizens for being "too soft". He also ordered the deployment of additional navy vessels in the region in response to the incident.

Prabowo is planning to massively expand Indonesia's domestic ability to manufacture ammunition, as Indonesia's capacity to manufacture is only 450 million ammunition per year, despite a demand at one billion ammunition annually. Prabowo is looking to strengthen Indonesia's military by acquiring newer fighter aircraft such as General Dynamics F-16 Fighting Falcon from the United States and Dassault Rafale from France.

Despite the controversy of his inaction in Natuna Island, a poll by Indo Barometer on early January show that Prabowo is the most popular minister in Jokowi's cabinet.

In October 2020, Prabowo visited the United States despite his previous ban from entering the country, in his capacity as Minister of Defense after being invited by his US counterpart Mark Esper and a visa was issued for him. Several human rights organizations, including Amnesty International, had previously called for the Trump administration to cancel the visit. Prior to this, Prabowo also visited China in December 2019.

2024 presidential election 

On 7 January 2023, Prabowo launched his presidential campaign.

Controversies

Paradise Papers 
In November 2017 an investigation conducted by the International Consortium of Investigative Journalism cited his name in the list of politicians named in "Paradise Papers" allegations.

Ghost Fleet
On 18 September 2017, at the launch of a book on his father's political economy theory, Prabowo made a speech warning Indonesia could break apart in 2030. "In other countries, they have made studies, where the Republic of Indonesia has been declared no more in 2030," he said. A video clip of the speech was posted to Gerindra's official Facebook page on 18 March 2018. When asked which studies Prabowo was referring to, Gerindra official Elnino M. Husein Mohi said, "Prabowo has read various writings of people that are outside the country, intellectual observers that exist. You can also see them online." It was subsequently revealed the "studies" were actually a 2015 science-fiction war novel called Ghost Fleet by American authors August Cole and P.W. Singer. A note by the authors at the start of the book states: "The following was inspired by real-world trends and technologies. But, ultimately, it is a work of fiction, not prediction." Bemused by Prabowo citing the book, Singer posted on Twitter: "Indonesian opposition leader cites #GhostFleet in fiery campaign speeches... There have been many unexpected twists and turns from this book experience, but this may take the cake."

Haiti gaffe
In late 2018, Prabowo was ridiculed after erroneously stating that Haiti, a republic in the Caribbean, is an African country. In a speech made on 23 December 2018 in Solo, Central Java, Prabowo said the Indonesian government had driven part of Indonesia's wealth offshore. "If this continues to go on, Indonesia will continue to be impoverished," he said. "We, Indonesians, are on par with African impoverished countries such as Rwanda, Haiti, and small islands like Kiribati, which we don't even know where it's located," he added.

2019 presidential debate
On 17 January 2019, in the first debate between the candidates in Indonesia's April 2019 presidential election, Prabowo said some Indonesian governors deserve higher salaries considering the size of their provinces. He gave the example of Central Java province, which he claimed is larger than Malaysia (in population) . Local media reports pointed out that Central Java is 32,544.12 square kilometres, while Malaysia is 330,323 square kilometres. After the media reported on the error, Prabowo's campaign team claimed he had actually been referring to the population totals of Malaysia and Central Java.

In the same debate, Prabowo claimed that terrorist attacks in Indonesia were caused by poverty and perpetrated by non-Muslims disguised as Muslims, sent by other countries and controlled by foreigners. Media reports refuted his claims, pointing out that some Indonesian terrorist bombers were not poor and were not manipulated by foreigners.

Honours 

As an Indonesian Army officer, Prabowo received the following awards and decorations:

National Honours
 Grand Meritorious Military Order Star, 1 Class
 Army Meritorius Service Star, 1 Class
 Navy Meritorius Service Star, 1 Class
 Air Force Meritorius Service Star, 1 Class
  Army Meritorius Service Star, 2nd Class
  Grand Meritorious Military Order Star, 3rd Class
  Army Meritorious Service Star, 3rd Class
  Military Long Service Medal, 24 Years
  Military Operation Service Medal in Aceh
  Military Instructor Service Medal
  Military Operation Service Medal IX Raksaka Dharma w/ 1 gold star
  Timor Military Campaign Medal  w/ 2 gold star
  Role Model Medal

Foreign Honours

References

Citations

Sources

Further reading

 Asiaweek: An Idealist's Rise And Fall
 ABC Foreign Correspondent: The Farmer Wants a Country
 Jakarta Globe: Rebranding Brings Prabowo Into the Electoral Frame
 Military Politics and Democratization in Indonesia (Routledge Research on Southeast Asia)

1951 births
Indonesian generals
Indonesian National Military Academy alumni
Javanese people
Indonesian Muslims
Banyumasan people
Living people
Cendana family
Djojohadikusumo family
People from Jakarta
Indonesian anti-communists
Indonesian nationalists
Great Indonesia Movement Party politicians
Right-wing populism in Indonesia
Defense ministers of Indonesia
Onward Indonesia Cabinet
Government ministers of Indonesia
People named in the Paradise Papers